La Película is a 1975 Argentine film.

Cast
 Ernesto Bianco		
 Alejandra Boero		
 Nora Cullen		
 Ricardo Espalter		
 Cacho Espíndola		
 Diana Maggi		
 Héctor Pellegrini		
 Horacio Roca		
 Marilina Ross		
 Hugo Soto		
 Osvaldo Terranova		
 María Valenzuela

References

External links 
 

1975 films
Argentine comedy-drama films
1970s Spanish-language films
1970s Argentine films